Girls Preparatory School, or GPS, is an all-female college preparatory school in Chattanooga, Tennessee, United States. It was founded in 1906 by Grace Eliza McCallie, Tommie Payne Duffy, and Eula Lea Jarnagin. GPS enrolls students in grades 6–12. These students are taught by GPS's 66 faculty members, over 80% of whom hold advanced degrees. Since 2006, Girls Preparatory School has won 20 state championships in various sports. In addition, the school has graduated 49 National Merit Semifinalists in the past 13 years. For the 2019–20 school year, GPS enrolled 560 girls from 28 zip codes, with 210 in Middle School and 350 in Upper School.

Its brother school, The McCallie School, was founded a year earlier by McCallie's brothers. GPS's Interim Head of School is Dr. Kirk Walker, former headmaster at The McCallie School.

History

Origins 
In 1906, Duffy and Jarnagin, two public school teachers, asked the city school board to provide a fourth year of high school studies, including modern language and a lab science, so that girls, as well as boys, would apply for college. When their request was denied, they decided to create an independent school to prepare girls for higher education and convinced their friend Grace McCallie to join them.

In 12 weeks, they converted McCallie's former home to a school. The three founders pooled all of their money, $300, to equip and launch the school. The school opened on September 12, 1906, in a four-room schoolhouse at 106 Oak Street, which had formerly been McCallie's home. The ground floor contained classrooms with second-hand desks. There was also an alcove library and cloakroom.

The school welcomed 45 enrolled students on the first day of classes on September 12, 1906. Each girl paid $80 tuition per year, and at the end of the first year one of the students was accepted to and enrolled in Randolph-Macon Woman's College. In 1915, the school relocated to a larger brick building at 611 Palmetto Street. In 1947, GPS again moved, this time to its current home on Island Avenue, with 14 classrooms, a study hall, library and dining hall. Since the move, the campus has been significantly added on to and revitalized, with the addition of a separate middle school and high school, an 800-seat theater, and a new student center, among other facilities.

Girls Preparatory School celebrated its 100th anniversary during the 2005–2006 school year.

Milestones 

 1907: The tradition of Cat-Rat begins with seniors welcoming new students. Girls learning to support one another is a tradition that continues today.
 1909: GPS spearheads the establishment of the city's first girls basketball league.
 1914: The first May Day celebration was a picnic with a Greek theme. Today's spring tradition honors the seniors and their May Court with dances and a winding of the May Pole.
 1915: GPS moves to a new building on Palmetto St., adding a science lab, study hall, and multi-purpose space. An additional lot provides space for P.E. classes.
 1918: On March 10, Grace McCallie dies. In her honor, the Grace McCallie Scholarship is awarded.
 1924: The regulation uniform is a linen dress with tucks, two pockets, and large black bow. That beloved dress is now in cotton and in a rainbow of colors.
 '1945: GPS establishes a school-wide Honor System. The Honor Code remains a foundational part of the school for students and alumnae.
 '1945: With the end of the tenure of founders Duffy and Jarnagin, the school begins operation by a board of trustees. The Board purchases land in North Chattanooga for a new campus site.
 '1947: On August 29, the Class of ’47 buries a time capsule in the new school’s Cornerstone, a time capsule opened in 2006 at the school’s Centennial celebration.
 1948: GPS hires full-time art and music teachers, establishing what is now a Fine and Performing Arts department.
 1950: Seniors begin the tradition of talks to the student body with two-minute Chapel Talks, demonstrating how, at GPS, they find their voice.
 1955: Following a year in which GPS offers modern dance classes, Terpsichord, the state’s first high school contemporary dance company, is begun by Peggy Evans Thomas, for whom today’s dance studios are named.
 1974: With the only girls golf team in Tennessee, the GPS Bruisers compete against local boys teams.
 1977: The Class of 1978 begins the “turning the ring” tradition. Even today, alumnae recognize each other by their distinctive black onyx stone topped with the GPS crest.
 1990: The physical education department adopts a new program, SHAPE, standing for Starting Habits to Attain Physical Excellence. The program receives recognition as one of the top high school physical education programs in the Southeast.
 1994: GPS establishes rowing as a varsity sport, becoming the first school in the Chattanooga area to field a girls team. Over 20 girls have gone on to row at the college level.
 1997: The GPS Learning Center opens to support students in acquiring skills for academic work.
 1998-99: Chattanooga's first laptop school, GPS continues to lead area schools in the development of a computer science curriculum
 1999: GPS welcomes a sixth grade to the newly built Elizabeth Lupton Davenport Middle School.
 2005: GPS fields a varsity lacrosse team, the first girls team in Chattanooga.
 2005-06: Students, faculty, alumnae and friends commemorate the 100th anniversary of GPS with a walk from the campus to a celebration at Memorial Auditorium, passing the site of the original school. The walk is followed by a party to honor the contributions of the city's only independent girls’ school.
 2012-13: The College Board selects the GPS Fine & Performing Arts department for its Award for Excellence and Innovation in the Arts.

Academics

GPS offers a Middle School curriculum for grades 6–8, and an Upper School offering for grades 9–12.

The Upper School offers 24 Advanced Placement courses, ranging from AP Biology to AP Comparative Government and Politics, as well as various STEM course offerings.

 Athletics 
GPS competes in the Tennessee Secondary School Athletic Association (TSSAA) and its varsity sports are:

 Basketball
 Bowling
 Cheerleading
 Climbing
 Cross Country
 Diving
 Golf
 Lacrosse
 Rowing
 Soccer
 Softball
 Swimming
 Tennis
 Track and Field
 Volleyball

 Programs 

 Cadek Conservatory of Music 
The Cadek Conservatory of Music at Girls Preparatory School provides the highest level of musical instruction for students of all ages—from infants through senior adults—in private, group, and ensemble settings.

 Partnerships in the Community (PIC) 
A broad spectrum of community organizations and components of local governments are part of PIC: East Side Elementary School and Chattanooga Girls Leadership Academy; City of Chattanooga Office of Multicultural Affairs and the Northside Neighborhood House; Habitat for Humanity of the Greater Chattanooga Area and the Chattanooga Area Food Bank.

 Tucker River Fellows 
At the retirement of former longtime headmaster Randy Tucker, the GPS Board of Trustees and friends of the school joined to honor his tenure with the establishment of the Tucker Fellows Program, a two-year student study of the Tennessee River. The mission of the program, which began in the summer before the 2014–15 school year, is to prepare future leaders to have an effect on the conservation of the Tennessee River. Fellows, selected prior to their freshman year, spend part of the summer and following academic year engaged in interdisciplinary scholarship and experiential learning about the many issues impacting their local watershed as well as learning about the historical, ecological, political, economic and aesthetic significance of the Tennessee River.  

During the second year in the program, fellows focus on leadership skills while continuing to learn about the river and watershed. They read and discuss the works of current and historic environmental thinkers. They choose a focus and work with local experts, scientific literature, and policy to become more knowledgeable about their chosen topic. They then collect, analyze, and publish data. Throughout the program, fellows become familiar with the various entities that implement, enforce, and monitor watershed policy. By the end of the program, fellows propose solutions to watershed problems and become lifelong advocates for clean, healthy watersheds in the Chattanooga area and beyond.  

 Traditions 
GPS upholds many traditions that are celebrated throughout the school year, with many including community service opportunities.

 May Day 
While most traditions are school-wide, some focus on certain grades. One such tradition is May Day, a pageant that combines the old traditions of a May Day from the Renaissance and a debutante pageant. The senior class is presented in colorful dresses, one by one, with a May Court and May Queen introduced separately; the May Queen is the last presented. The May Queen and Court are nominated by the senior class and then chosen by the student body and faculty based upon personality and embodiment of a true GPS girl. After the class is introduced, festivities are held on the school's front lawn, and seniors, guests, and the student body watch as different grades dance to music chosen to match that year's theme. The last dance is the May Pole ceremony, in which sophomores wrap three traditional May Poles for the Queen to walk under, ending the ceremony.

 Senior Chapel Talks 
Another tradition is that of senior Chapel Talks. Each senior gives a three- to seven-minute talk about a subject of her choosing to her peers and invited guests during a schoolwide assembly, also called Chapel, which occurs several times a week.

 Cat-Rat 
Another highly celebrated tradition is that of Cat-Rat, a pairing of a senior with a new sixth-grader. In this tradition the senior Cat acts as a mentor and friend to the sixth grader, her Rat. Cats decorate their Rats’ lockers prior to the start of school, and the revealing of the newly decorated locker is a key part of the Cat-Rat Reveal (which also takes place just before the start of school). In addition, during the Cat-Rat Reveal, the sixth grade Rats take part in a random drawing which determines the order of their Cats’ Chapel Talks. Several parties, activities, and celebrations help the girls get to know each other better and allow the senior girl to guide the younger student through her school year. The long-standing tradition has been known to bond students as friends and even business partners well into adulthood.

 Robin Hood 
Formerly, a weeklong festival was planned each year by an elected committee of students, known as Robin Hood. In the festival, any school-recognized club or team is able to open a booth and sell a craft or food for a charity of their choice. The committee itself could also operate a booth, which would benefit the overall goal of that year's Robin Hood. In the past, the main goal has been to gift Greg Mortenson, author of Three Cups of Tea: One Man's Mission To Promote Peace... One School At A Time and the founder of Central Asia Institute, with the money to endow a girls' school in Pakistan.  Another year it was to help assist a like-minded Chattanooga school with a contribution to Chattanooga Girl's Leadership Academy, an all girls college preparatory charter school focusing on STEM education, the first public single-gender school in Tennessee. This long-standing tradition, however, was phased out by 2014.

 MBD: Girl Edition 
One of GPS's newer traditions, MBD: Girl Edition, is an entrepreneurial opportunity for girls in and around the Chattanooga area to seek knowledge and support from local professionals. It debuted in 2015 as a women's and girls' symposium, Mad Bad and Dangerous, and has hosted such notable guest speakers as Lori Greiner, prolific inventor and "Shark Tank" star. The most recent installment features a one-day Girls Marketplace, where girls can sell products and services, and a 24Hour Generator, which pairs students with mentors to help them solve real-world business problems as they compete for a cash prize. The event relies heavily on volunteers and financial support of businesses and community organizations.

 Other 
The onsite garden is maintained and cultivated by the environmental science class, a junior and senior science elective. The crops grown in the garden are chosen and raised by the students, harvested, and taken to the Chattanooga Area Food Bank, or included in the school's lunch menu.

There are many other traditions as well, such as a long-standing partnership with Habitat for Humanity, and leadership summer camps.

Notable alumnae and faculty 

 Alumnae 

 Carman Barnes, writer
Rachel Boston, actress
Tracy Seretean, Academy Award-winning filmmaker
Andrea Saul, Republican Party operative
Teresa Phillips, First female NCAA Division 1 Men's Basketball coach 
Mai Belle Hurley, first female member of the Chattanooga City Council 
Lisa Hendy, recipient of the Harry Yount Award of the National Park Service 
Judge Marie Williams, first woman appointed judge of the Eleventh Circuit Court of Tennessee 
R. Marie Griffith, John C. Danforth Distinguished Professor at Washington University in St. Louis, and author

 Headmasters 

 1906-18: Grace Eliza McCallie
 1906-45: Tommie Payne Duffy
 1906-45: Eula Lea Jarnagin
 1947-50: Edith M. Lewis
 1950-66: Mary Hannah Tucker
 1966-73: Dr. Paul G. Bode
 1973-87: Dr. Nathaniel C. Hughes, Jr.
 1987-2013: Stanley R. Tucker, Jr.
 2013-14: Sue Groesbeck (Interim)
 2014-20: Dr. Autumn A. Graves
 2020-21''': Dr. R. Kirk Walker (Interim)''

References

External links

1906 establishments in Tennessee
Educational institutions established in 1906
Girls' schools in Tennessee
Preparatory schools in Tennessee
Private high schools in Tennessee
Private middle schools in Tennessee
Schools in Chattanooga, Tennessee